Michael Coleman (born 12 May 1946) is a British author of children's and young adult fiction whose book, Weirdo's War, was shortlisted for the 1996 Carnegie Medal. One of his books, Net Bandits, has been adapted to film.

Coleman is a published author of children's books and young adult books. Some of the published credits include Football Stories, The Ups and Downs of the Premier League (Foul Football), Flaming Olympics 2008 with Quiz Book. A native of Forest Gate in the London Borough of Newham, Coleman has written nearly a hundred books, including fifteen titles in the Angels FC series and five titles, The Cure, Going Straight, The Snog Log, Tag and Weirdo's War for "10 and older" readers.

Biography
Coleman was born in Forest Gate, a suburb in east London. Not long after he was born, his family moved a few miles east to Barking. At the time of his arrival, the area was just starting to recover from the damage it had received during World War II. He lived in a house on Bevan Avenue, named after Aneurin Bevan the architect of the National Health Service. He lived in that estate for 20 years. The area helped develop Coleman's love of sport due to the oblong shaped lanes of grass leading up the estate, which could be used as mini-stadiums. He pretended to play at various sporting events of the time, e.g. the Melbourne Olympics of 1956, the soccer Cup Final at Wembley Stadium, and the games at Lords Cricket ground. He still has medals he won for being school champion in the 100m sprint and the long jump. As said by Coleman himself "My information series Foul Football tries to convey some of the magic I felt about the game of soccer by relating the weird and wonderful history of the game and the personalities it has seen over the years. On the fiction side, my series about a junior soccer team called Angels FC tries to bring out the humour and sheer fun that you’ll find at the heart of the game when it’s played by youngsters who don’t even know how to spell the word cynicism." Coleman had his first children's book published when he was 46 years of age. He has also said: "I didn't [want to become a writer] at first. I used to teach computer science at a university and my first book was a boring one about computers. I livened it up by putting a few jokes in. At the end I thought I'd try writing a few more things, but this time forgetting about the computers and concentrating on the jokes. After lots of failures I realised that youngsters enjoy jokes more than adults and started writing for them. Eighty books later, I'm still doing it...I write both fact and fiction. The Foul Football series are favourite fact books, simply because they're about football. On the fiction side, I'm just finishing a trilogy called The Bearkingdom. They're dark and scary, quite different to anything I've written before.

Additional information
His favourite footballer is Trevor Brooking - having been neighbours with him and versing his a couple of times as a child. He has a wife and four children. His favourite team is West Ham. Apart from sport, his favourite subjects at school were Maths and Physics. His favourite author is Enid Blyton, and his favourite illustrators are those of the Roy of the Rovers comic strip in the Tiger magazine.

List of publications

Picture books
 The Mum Who Was Made Of Money (Magi Publications)
 Lazy Ozzie (Magi Publications)
 Ridiculous! (Magi Publications)
 One, Two, Three, Oops! (Magi Publications)
 George and Sylvia: A Tale of True Love (Little Tiger Press)
 Hank The Clank (OUP)
 Hank Clanks Again (OUP)
 Hank Clanks Back (OUP)

Young fiction
 Fizzy Hits the Headlines (Orchard Books)
 Fizzy Steals the Show (Orchard Books)
 Fizzy TV Star (Orchard Books)
 Fizzy in the Spotlight (Orchard Books)

Angels FC series (all published by Orchard)
 Touchline Terror!   
 Dirty Defending!    
 Handball Horror!   
 Gruesome Goalkeeping!     
 Midfield Madness!      
 Goal Greedy!      
 Frightful Fouls!    
 Dazzling Dribbling!     
 Fearsome Free-Kicks!      
 Awesome Attacking!     
 Wicked Wingers!
 Shocking Shooting
 Suffering Substitutes!
 Crafty Coaching!

Junior fiction
 Triv in Pursuit (The Bodley Head and Red Fox)
 Gizzmo Lewis, Fairly Secret Agent (Random House and Red Fox)
 Lexy Boyd and the Spadewell Sparklers (Random House and Red Fox)
 Madame Retsmah Predicts (Scholastic Publications)
 Shoot, Dad! (Scholastic)
 Danger Signs (Barrington Stoke)

The Bearkingdom Trilogy (Orchard Books) 
 The Howling Tower
 The Fighting Pit
 The Hunting Forest

Older fiction
 Weirdo's War (Orchard Books); and as Barjo (Editions Rouergue, France)
 Tag (Orchard Books)
 Going Straight (Orchard Books); and as On The Run (USA), Filer Droit (Editions Rouergue, France)
 The Snog Log (Orchard Books and Marshall Cavendish, USA)
 The Cure (Orchard Books)

Non-Fiction (all Scholastic)
 Flaming Olympics
 Flaming Olympics Quiz Book 
 Top Ten Bible Stories 
 Top Ten Fairy Stories 
 Crashing Computers

The Foul Football Series (Scholastic)
 Foul Football
 Wicked World Cup
 Furious Euros
 Come On, England!
 The Ups and Downs of the Premier League
 Phenomenal FA Cup
 Legendary Leagues
 Prize Players
 Triumphant Teams
 Even Fouler Football
 Ultimate Fan's handbook
 Kickin' Quiz Book
 The World Cup Quiz Book

Internet Detectives (Macmillan Children's Books) 
 Net Bandits
 Escape Key
 Speed Surf
 Cyber Feud
 System Crash
 Web Trap
 Virus Attack (with Alan Frewin Jones)
 Access Denied (with Alan Frewin Jones)

Junior fiction written as 'Fiona Kelly'
 Mystery Kids 3: Treasure Hunt (Hodder Children's Books)
 Mystery Kids 6: Funny Money (Hodder Children's Books) 
 Mystery Kids 9: Wrong Number (Hodder Children's Books)

Older fiction for low-reading-age children
 Double Trouble (Learning Development Aids)
 Grounds for Suspicion/Race against Time (10 minute thrillers) (Learning Development Aids)
 Thrilling Comprehension Support material for use with 5 & 10 minute Thrillers (Learning Development Aids)

References

External links 

 Michael Cole information page at Orchard Books
 Michael Coleman: Questions and Answers. Scholastic. Retrieved 23 December 2013.
 Author Profiles; Michael Coleman Q&A Session. The Word Pool.
 

1946 births
Living people
English children's writers